Lee Kwang-moon (born August 4, 1983) is a South Korean rugby union player. He plays as a number eight and occasionally a flanker.

External links 
 

1983 births
Living people
South Korean rugby union players
Rugby union number eights
Rugby union flankers
Tokyo Sungoliath players
Toshiba Brave Lupus Tokyo players
Toyota Verblitz players
Korea University alumni
South Korean expatriate rugby union players
Expatriate rugby union players in Japan
South Korean expatriate sportspeople in Japan
Asian Games medalists in rugby union
Rugby union players at the 2006 Asian Games
Asian Games silver medalists for South Korea
Medalists at the 2006 Asian Games